This is a list of the number-one songs of 2018 in Bolivia. The airplay charts are published by Monitor Latino, based on airplay across radio stations in Bolivia using the Radio Tracking Data, LLC in real time. Charts are compiled from Monday to Sunday.

Chart history

References

Bolivia 2018
Number-one songs
Bolivia